Bessinger is a surname. Notable people with the surname include:

Maurice Bessinger (1930–2014), American BBQ restaurateur and politician
Niko Bessinger (1948–2008), Namibian politician and independence activist

See also
Bissinger

Surnames of German origin